Systenoplacis is a genus of spiders in the family Zodariidae. It was first described in 1907 by Simon. , it contains 22 African species.

Species

Systenoplacis comprises the following species:
 S. biguttatus Jocqué, 2009 — Cameroon
 S. biunguis (Strand, 1913) — Central Africa
 S. fagei (Lawrence, 1937) — South Africa
 S. falconeri (Caporiacco, 1949) — Kenya
 S. giltayi (Lessert, 1929) — Congo
 S. howelli Jocqué, 2009 — Tanzania
 S. maculatus (Marx, 1893) — Central, East Africa
 S. manga Jocqué, 2009 — Tanzania
 S. maritimus Jocqué, 2009 — Tanzania
 S. michielsi Jocqué, 2009 — Kenya
 S. microguttatus Jocqué, 2009 — Tanzania
 S. minimus Jocqué, 2009 — Tanzania
 S. multipunctatus (Berland, 1920) — Kenya
 S. obstructus Jocqué, 2009 — Tanzania
 S. patens Jocqué, 2009 — Tanzania
 S. quinqueguttatus Jocqué, 2009 — Nigeria
 S. scharffi Jocqué, 2009 — Tanzania
 S. septemguttatus Simon, 1907 (type) — Guinea-Bissau
 S. thea Jocqué, 2009 — Tanzania
 S. turbatus Jocqué, 2009 — Ivory Coast
 S. vandami (Hewitt, 1916) — South Africa
 S. waruii Jocqué, 2009 — Kenya, Tanzania

References

Zodariidae
Araneomorphae genera
Spiders of Africa